The Solidarity Center is a non-profit organization aligned with the AFL–CIO labor federation. It is one of the core grantees of the National Endowment for Democracy.

Its stated mission is to help build a global labor movement by strengthening the economic and political power of workers around the world through effective, independent, and democratic unions.

History
The AFL-CIO established the Solidarity Center in 1997.  The Solidarity Center was created through the consolidation of four labor institutes: the American Institute for Free Labor Development, the Asian-American Free Labor Institute, the African-American Labor Institute, and the Free Trade Union Institute.  The pre-existing institutes were merged by John Sweeney shortly after he became president of the AFL–CIO.

The AFL-CIO had worked internationally for many decades. With some funding from the Office of Strategic Services and the Central Intelligence Agency, it had worked to stop Communist movements in Western Europe after World War II. With the 1997 launch of the Solidarity Center, those ties ended.

Today, the Solidarity Center works with unions, worker associations and community groups to provide a wide range of education, training, research, legal support and other resources to help build strong and effective trade unions and more just and equitable societies. Its programs—in more than 60 countries—focus on human and worker rights awareness, union skills, occupational safety and health, economic literacy, human trafficking, women's empowerment and bolstering workers in an increasingly informal economy. Solidarity Center programs support and contribute to the global movement for labor rights.

In 2002, the Solidarity Center, the international arm of the AFL-CIO, received $154,377 from the United States National Endowment for Democracy to assist the CTV in Venezuela.  Shortly after, the leader of the CTV, Carlos Ortega, worked closely with Pedro Carmona Estanga, the president of the Venezuelan Chamber of Commerce, to stage the failed Venezuelan coup of 2002.

Programs
The Solidarity Center assisted in Haiti's FTZ (Free Trade Zone).   When textile manufacturer Grupo M, the Dominican Republic’s largest employer, applied to the International Finance Corporation (the World Bank’s private sector lending arm) for a $20 million loan to open a factory on the Haiti-Dominican border, the Solidarity Center, the International Confederation of Free Trade Unions (ICFTU) and the Dominican Federation of Free Trade Zone Workers (FEDOTRAZONAS) worked together to condition the loan on respect for worker rights.

Funding
More than 96 percent of its funding comes from the United States federal government, mostly through U.S. Aid for International Development (USAID) and the National Endowment for Democracy.
The NED distributes grants to four institutes, two associated with economic interests and two with political interests. The Solidary Center is associated with labor.

The Solidarity Center receives funding from private foundations as well.

Field offices
The Solidarity Center's main offices are in Washington, D.C. The organization has field offices in roughly 28 countries and programs in approximately 60 countries.

References

Further reading

AFL–CIO
International development agencies
Organizations established in 1997
Non-profit organizations based in Washington, D.C.
National Endowment for Democracy